SS Skosana Nature Reserve is a protected area in Mpumalanga, South Africa.

References

Mpumalanga Provincial Parks
Nature reserves in South Africa